Liuji Township is a township of Yucheng County in eastern Henan province, China, located about  south of the border with Shandong and  northeast of the county seat. , it has 23 villages under its administration.

See also 
 List of township-level divisions of Henan

References 

Township-level divisions of Henan
Yucheng County